Ramji Raghavan is a social innovator and entrepreneur. He is the founder and chairperson of Agastya International Foundation and Chairperson of the Navam Innovation Foundation, both Non Profit Organizations. Ramji served as a member of the Central Advisory Board of Education, Government of India. He is member of the Governing Council of the Marico Innovation Foundation . He has also served as a board member of Vigyan Prasar and as a member of the Working Group on Attracting Children to Science and Math of the Prime Minister's National Knowledge Commission. Ramiji is a well-recognized public speaker  and has spoken at the Education World Forum, the annual INK Conference in association with TED, the Clinton Global Initiative, Harvard India Conference,  MIT Media Lab, Peking University, Indian Institute of Science, the Tata Institute of Fundamental Research the PanIIT Conference, the Confederation of Indian Industry, Deshpande Development Dialogue, the Indian Institute of Management – Bangalore, the WISE Summit 2014, Qatar and Indiaspora, USA and RAFT- Resource Area For Teaching, Bay Area, USA. He has also addressed school and university students, faculty, entrepreneurs and corporate leaders and executives at Honeywell  , IBM  , Morgan Stanley  , Bosch  , E&Y  , ASCENT Foundation  , EdelWeiss  , Reliance   and Google   on curiosity, creativity, innovation and leadership.

Early life and education
Ramji was raised in Bihar, Uttar Pradesh and Calcutta where his father KV Raghavan served as Managing Director of the ICI Group company, Alkali and Chemical Corporation of India Limited and later as Chairman of Engineers India Limited and President of EID Parry Limited. Ramji's father and his maternal uncle, Dr. P. K. Iyengar, former Chairman of the Indian Atomic Energy Commission were founder trustees of Agastya International Foundation. A product of Rishi Valley School, founded by the philosopher Jiddu Krishnamurti, Ramji was early on exposed to the power of self-awareness to create social change and dreamt of building a school for creative leaders in India. With support from the government of Andhra Pradesh, Ramji and his colleagues established a 172-acre campus creativity lab near Bangalore. In 2007 Agastya signed a MoU with stock market investor Rakesh Jhunjhunwala, which helped Agastya to scale its outreach activity and build its creative campus. In 2010 the Government of Karnataka signed a MoU with Agastya International Foundation to establish an ecosystem for hands-on science education in the state. Wisdom of Agastya, an illustrated book authored by Vasant Nayak and Shay Taylor of the MurthyNayak Foundation in Baltimore, USA, chronicles Ramji and his team's journey between 1999 and 2014 in building Agastya International Foundation. Ramji is married to Monica (née Sanghani), great great granddaughter of Devkaran Nanjee, the founder of Dena Bank. Ramji holds an MBA from the London Business School and a Post-Graduate Diploma in Development Studies from The International Institute of Social Studies, The Netherlands. He graduated from Hans Raj College, University of Delhi.

Career
As per popular media, Ramji started his career as a consultant with A. F. Ferguson & Co., followed by Citibank in India, Puerto Rico and New York City. Later he worked with the Europe based Cedel Group as Director and member of the Strategic Advisory Group.

In 1998, Ramji left his commercial career in banking and finance to create Agastya International Foundation, which has reached creative hands-on science education to over 15 million underprivileged children and 250,000 government school teachers across India. Under Ramji Agastya has pioneered many educational innovations at scale, including mobile science labs, lab-on-a-bike and peer-to-peer learning via mega science fairs for underprivileged children. Agastya's 172-acre campus creativity lab houses over fifteen experiential science, art and innovation centers, including the Ramanujan Math Park. In the late 1980s, Ramji met Janaki Ammal, wife of the mathematical genius, Srinivasa Ramanujan in Triplicane, Madras. In a blog appearing in a TIFR journal, Ramji mentions Mrs. Ramanujan telling him, "no one remembers my husband anymore". More than a decade later, a bust of Ramanujan was installed in the Agastya campus creativity lab. Agastya gifted identical busts to the Institute of Mathematical Sciences, Cambridge University, the Indian Institute of Science, Bangalore, TIFR’s Institute of Applicable Mathematics, Bangalore, the Indian Institute of Technology, Madras and MIT, USA.

Agastya’s hands-on physical activity came to a standstill during most of 2020 as schools in India closed down because of COVID-19. Philanthropic donations, including corporate CSR contributions, fell substantially. Agastya was forced to cut down expenses while it continued to retain most of its employees. For those underprivileged children and schoolteachers who had digital access Agastya introduced online learning with a home activity lab leading to a new Agastya 2025 vision based on blended “phygital” learning. Agastya’s response to the Covid crisis led to Prof. Phanish Puranam of INSEAD and Iulia Strate of Skills for Mars interviewing Ramji for its series on ‘building resilience.’ In March 2021 Agastya announced the creation of Navam Innovation Foundation in partnership with the Pravaha Foundation of Hyderabad.

Recognitions
In 2009, Ramji was elected as a senior fellow by Ashoka: Innovators for the Public.
In 2011, Ramji was featured on Indian TV channel Times Now in its program Amazing Indians and honoured with the People's Hero award by the Coimbatore unit of Confederation of Indian Industry (CII) at its silver jubilee celebrations. In 2012, Ramji was featured on CNBC Awaaz's program "Bharat Bhagya Vidhata". Under Ramji's chairmanship Agastya International Foundation won the Google Global Impact Award 2013 and was ranked by The Rockefeller Foundation NextCentury Awards among the top 100 global innovators. In 2016 Ramji received the Deshpande Foundation's Sandbox Catalyst Award from Nobel laureate Muhammad Yunus and the Innovation for India award from the Marico Innovation Foundation Ramji and Rakesh Jhunjhunwala were also featured on CNBC TV's Daan Utsav programme. In 2017 Ramji was awarded The Rotary Club of Madras East Vocational Skilling Excellence Award. He was also featured in the Stanford Social Innovation Review. In 2019 Agastya received an Andhra Pradesh State Green Award for its work in regenerating the ecosystem of its 172-acre campus, documented in a book, 'The Roots of Creativity'. In 2020 Ramji and Agastya International Foundation were featured in the book, 7 Sutras of Innovation by Nikhil Inamdar, which tracks the journeys of eight organizations that have scaled up to become top players in their own fields and are transforming India.

References

External links
 Agastya

Indian chief executives
Indian social entrepreneurs
20th-century Indian businesspeople
Living people
Alumni of London Business School
Indian bankers
Businesspeople from Bangalore
Year of birth missing (living people)
Ashoka Fellows